is a Japanese curler and curling coach from Kitami, Hokkaido, Japan.

He represented Japan at the 1998 Winter Olympics in Nagano, where the Japanese men's team placed 5th.

His daughter is Japanese female curler Anna Ohmiya, participant of Japan women's curling team on 2010 Winter Olympics in Vancouver, Canada.

Teams and events

Record as a coach of national teams

References

External links
 

1959 births
Living people
Japanese male curlers
Japanese curling champions
Olympic curlers of Japan
Curlers at the 1998 Winter Olympics
Japanese curling coaches
People from Kitami, Hokkaido
Sportspeople from Hokkaido